The Purple Taxi is a 1977 French-Irish-Italian film directed by Yves Boisset, based on the 1973 novel of the same name by Michel Déon. It was entered into the 1977 Cannes Film Festival.

Plot
The film is about a group of emotionally troubled expatriates living in a self-imposed exile in a small village (Eyeries) on the Beara Peninsula in Ireland. The cast includes Peter Ustinov, Charlotte Rampling, Agostina Belli, Philippe Noiret, Edward Albert and, somewhat eccentrically cast as a small-town Irish physician, Fred Astaire.

Film score
The film's score was performed by The Chieftains.

Cast
 Charlotte Rampling - Sharon Frederick
 Peter Ustinov - Taubelman
 Fred Astaire - Dr. Seamus Scully
 Edward Albert - Jerry
 Philippe Noiret - Philippe Marcal
 Agostina Belli - Anne Taubelman
 Jack Watson - Sean
 Mairin D. O'Sullivan - Colleen
 David Kelly - Little Person
 Niall Buggy - Little Person
 May Cluskey - (as May Clusky)
 Loan Do Huu - Madame Li
 Brendon Doyle
 Michael Duffy
 Derek Lord

References

External links 

1977 films
1977 drama films
French drama films
Italian drama films
Films directed by Yves Boisset
Films scored by Philippe Sarde
Films based on French novels
Films set in Ireland
Films shot in Ireland
1970s French-language films
English-language French films
English-language Italian films
1970s French films
1970s Italian films